I Don't Like Driving is a Spanish comedy television series created and directed by Borja Cobeaga. Produced by Sayaka Producciones for Warner Bros. Discovery, it stars Juan Diego Botto, alongside Leonor Watling, Lucía Caraballo, and David Lorente.

Plot 
The plot follows Pablo Lopetegui, a misanthropic university lecturer in his 40s believing himself to be morally superior to others who needs to get a driving license. To that purpose, he joins a driving school, meeting with one of his alumns at the university (Yolanda), and driving teacher Lorenzo, among others. Meanwhile, Lopetegui also maintains a very amicable relationship with his ex-wife.

Cast

Production 
The series is a Sayaka Producciones production. Diana Rojo, Borja González Santaolalla, Valentina Viso, and  collaborated in writing duties. Shooting locations included Madrid, the province of Cuenca, Carranque, San Lorenzo de El Escorial, Alcalá de Henares, San Sebastián de los Reyes, and San Martín de la Vega.

Release 
The first three episodes pre-screened at the Serializados Fest on 25 October 2022. The series premiered on TNT on 25 November 2022. In the US, the series debuted exclusively on HBO Max on 12 January 2023.

Accolades 

|-
| rowspan = "4" align = "center" | 2023 || rowspan = "4" | 10th Feroz Awards || colspan = "2" | Best Comedy Series ||  || rowspan = "4" | 
|-
| Best Actor in a TV Series || Juan Diego Botto || 
|-
| Best Supporting Actress in a TV Series || Leonor Watling || 
|-
| Best Supporting Actor in a TV Series || David Lorente || 
|}

References 

Spanish comedy television series
Television shows filmed in Spain
Television shows set in Madrid
2020s Spanish comedy television series
2022 Spanish television series debuts
Spanish-language television shows
TNT (Spanish TV channel) original programming